Yeon Ja-yu (Hangul: 연자유, Hanja: 淵子遊, ?-?) was the Magniji (Prime Minister) of Goguryeo during its waning days, and was the grandfather of Yeon Gaesomun, who was Dae Magniji and dictator of Goguryeo before its fall. Yeon Ja-yu was the father of Yeon Taejo, the father of Yeon Gaesomun, and Magniji after Ja-yu. Historical records do not provide his life dates or his actions as Magniji.

Background 
Not much is known about Yeon Ja-yu's background except that his ancestor was said to have been "born in the water." Historians have tried to translate this text, and have established that the Yeon ancestor may have been born at sea or near a river. It is apparent that his family was a very powerful one in Goguryeo, having led the Eastern province of Goguryeo kingdom for an unknown number of generations.

Legacy 
After the death of Yeon Ja-yu, his eldest son Yeon Taejo succeeds him to the positions of Magniji and Daedaero of the Eastern province of Goguryeo kingdom. After the death of Yeon Taejo, his eldest son Yeon Gaesomun was refused his rightful positions by the other nobles of Goguryeo, and had to stage a coup that overthrew the King Yeongnyu at the time. Gaesomun became the first Dae Magniji in the history of Goguryeo. After Yeon Gaesomun's death, his sons ravaged the kingdom apart with their struggles amongst themselves. With this, Goguryeo eventually fell to the Tang Dynasty and the southern Korean kingdom Silla in 668. Yeon Ja-yu was later mentioned in on the Steles of his great-grandsons Yeon Namsaeng and Yeon Namgeon.

Last Name 
The Steles of Yeon Namsaeng and Yeon Namgeon record Yeon Ja-yu's last name as "Cheon." This has been known to be the work of Tang historians who changed the last name "Yeon" to "Cheon" because Tang Gaozu's name was Yuan, which had the same pronunciation as the last name "Yeon".

See also 
 Three Kingdoms of Korea
 Goguryeo
 Yeon Taejo
 Yeon Gaesomun

Goguryeo people
History of Korea
6th-century heads of government